Magnitogorsk State University (MaSU) (Magnitogórskiy gosudárstvennyy universitét) was a university in Magnitogorsk, Russia, founded on 1 October 1932.

In 2013–2014, it was merged into the Magnitogorsk State Technical University and ceased its existence as a separate entity.

Academic facilities 

MaSU claimed to be rapidly turning into a classical university. In the last 10 years Magnitogorsk University has increased teacher training in the South Ural region.

The university comprised 14 departments and 59 chairs where more than 700 teachers, more than 60% of which held the academic title of Candidates or Doctors of Sciences. The university facilities include computer and language laboratories, modern specialized laboratories, the Publishing Complex, the Sports Centre and student hostels. Nearly two dozen computer laboratories are united in a common computer network and connected to the Internet.

MaSU is a university complex comprising the University itself, the Lycee, the Department of refresher training and professional retraining, the South Ural Centre for monitoring the education system and the Institution of Pedagogy.

Academics 

 14 departments
 59 chairs
 55 areas and specialities of higher professional education, 21 of them - Baccalaureate
 27 programmes for supplementary education required in the region

University buildings 

The university facilities included 8 buildings, 4 hostels, and a Sports Centre.

The main University building, the Painting building, the Department of Technology building, the Department of Psychology building, the Institution of Pedagogy building, the South Ural Centre for monitoring the education system building, the Lycee of MaSU building, the Sports Centre building.

Students 
 18,000 students of full-time and part-time courses
 over 700 students get supplementary education which allows them to adapt to market conditions
 over 1000 learners of Refresher courses and professional retraining
 90% of the university graduates stay in the region. Since 2003 the number of graduates has increased from 1700 to 2634 people (more than 1,5 time). There was established a Centre for employment of graduates.

Educational programmes 

Programmes for higher professional education:

 Specialization
 Undergraduate courses
 Postgraduate courses
 Preparatory courses

Programmes for supplementary education:

 Professional retraining for executives and specialists in accordance with the profile of basic educational programmes
 Refresher training for executives and specialists in accordance with the profile of basic educational programmes
 Undergraduate courses

There has been developed a system of getting a second higher education at University

Teaching staff 

Training process is provided by 664 teachers:

 67 Doctors of sciences
 425 Candidates of sciences
 24 members of the Union of Artists of Russia
 13 members of the Union of Designers
 21 elected teachers of the public academies

Research 

 Postgraduate studies and doctoral studies in 16 specialities (170 learners)
 3 Dissertation councils (from 40 to 90 learners get the degree of Candidate or Doctor of sciences every year)
 Fundamental and applied scientific researches in 21 scientific fields

Departments

Department of Physics-mathematics 
Specialization (5 years)080116.65 – Mathematical methods in economics
010501.65 – Applied mathematics and computer science
010701 – Physics
50201.65 – Mathematics with an additional courses "Computer Science"
050203.65 – Physics with an additional courses "Computer Science"

Baccalaureate (4 years)010500.62 – Applied mathematics and computer science
050200.62 – Physics-mathematics education (profile - physics)

Chairs
 Chair of algebra and geometry
 Chair of mathematical analysis
 Chair of applied mathematics and computer facilities
 Chair of physics and its teaching methods
 Chair of mathematical methods in economics

Computer science Department 

Specialization (5 years)

080801.65 – Applied computer science in economics
050202.65 – Computer science

Baccalaureate (4 years)080700.62 – Business and computer science

Chairs
 Chair of computer science
 Chair of information system
 Chair of information technologies
 Chair of applied computer science.

Department of Philology 

Specialization (5 years)

031001.65 – Philology
050301.65 – Russian language and literature
031401.65 – Cultural science
030601.65 – Journalism

Baccalaureate (4 years)

031000.62 – Philology
030600.62 – Journalism

Chairs

 Chair of general linguistics and language history
 Chair of Russian language
 Chair of journalism and speech communication
 Chair of Russian classical literature
 Chair of Russian literature of the 20th century of the name of Professor Zamansky
 Chair of the newest Russian literature
 Chair of cultural science and foreign literature

Department of Theoretical and Applied Interpretation 

Specialization (5 years)

031201.65 – Theory and methods of teaching of foreign languages and cultures
031202.65 – Theoretical and applied interpretation (English, German, French languages)

Chairs

 Chair of theoretical and applied interpretation
 Chair of English language
 Chair of German language
 Chair of French language

Historical Department 

Specialization (5 years)

030401.65 – History
040201.65 – Sociology

Baccalaureate (4 years)

030400.62 – History
050400.62 – Socio-economic education
040200.62 – Sociology
040300.62 – Conflictology

Chairs

 Chair of Ancient and the Middle Ages history
 Chair of new and the newest history
 Chair of history of Russia

Department of Preschool Education 

Specialization (5 years)

050703.65 – Preschool pedagogy and psychology

Baccalaureate (4 years)

050700.62 – Pedagogy

Chairs

 Chair of preschool pedagogy and psychology
 Chair of physical education of preschool children
 Chair of management of education

Department of Social Work 

Specialization (5 years)

040101.65 – Social work

Baccalaureate (4 years)

040100.62 – Social work

Chairs

 Chair of theory and teaching methods of social work
 Chair of social pedagogy

Department of Psychology 

Specialization (5 years)

030301.65 – Psychology

Chairs

 Chair of general psychology
 Chair of social psychology
 Chair of developmental psychology and physiology

Department of Technology 

Specialization (5 years)

032401.65 – Advertising
261001.65 – Materials and design
260902.65 – Design Clothing
050502.65 – Technology and business

Baccalaureate (4 years)

050500.62 – Technological education

Chairs

 Chair of general technical disciplines
 Chair of theory and teaching methods of professional education
 Chair of advertising and art design
 Chair of decorative applied technologies

Economics and Management Department 

Specialization (5 years)

080507.65 – Management of enterprise

Baccalaureate (4 years)

050400.62 – Socio-economic education
080100.62 – Economics

Chairs

 Chair of business and economics
 Chair of management

Department of Pedagogy and Teaching Methods of Primary Education 

Specialization (5 years)

050708.65 – Pedagogy and teaching methods of primary education
050715.65 – Speech therapy
100103.65 – Socio-cultural service and tourism
032001.65 – Documentation and documental maintenance of management

Baccalaureate (4 years)

050700.62 – Pedagogy

Chairs

 Chair of speech therapy and teaching methods of improving work
 Chair of Russian language, literature and their teaching methods
 Chair of mathematics, natural-science disciplines and their teaching methods
 Chair of pedagogy and psychology of primary education

Department of the Fine Arts and Design 

Specialization (5 years)

050602.65 – Fine arts
070801.65 – Decorative-applied arts
070601.65 – Design
070603.65 – Interior design

Chairs

 Chair of painting
 Chair of descriptive geometry and graphics
 Chair of drawing
 Chair of theory of art education
 Chair of design
 Chair of art metal and ceramics
 Chair of suit design and art textiles

The Department of Refresher Training and Professional Retraining 

The main directions: refresher training and professional retraining of the specialists, organized in different forms: refresher training courses (short courses, from 72 to 100 hours; advanced courses, from 100 to 250 hours); problem seminars, business training, professional retraining of the executives and specialists (more than 500 hours) in accordance with the profile of the University, a second higher education.

The Department of the Individual Specialization 

The Department provides practical oriented specialization in psychological and pedagogical, scientific and economic directions. Annually students enrol for 18 courses (from 240 to 560 hours). Updating of courses occurs on the basis of marketing of requirements of a labour market and individual inquiries of students

The structure of the department:
 Psychological and Pedagogical Faculty
 Art and Creative Faculty
 Preparatory Courses
 Analytical and Vocational Centre
 The Centre for Employments of the Graduates

International Cooperation 

TEMPUS: 144853-TEMPUS-2008-FR-JPHES "Develop a framework of qualifications for the system of higher education in the Ural region"

Seventh Framework (FP7) for European Commission:
 Health
 Environment
 Socio-economic science and humanities

PIC (Participant Identification code) for the legal entity MaSU: 997334795

http://cordis.europa.eu

Cooperation with Universities 

 First University of Rennes
 Centre of archaeological researches (Gerona France)
 Toronto University (Canada)
 French archaeological school in Athens
 University of Mass (Italy)
 Bucharest University (Romania)
 Central European University (Budapest, Hungary)
 Arkansas Central University (USA)
 National Museum of Denmark
 German Academic Exchange Service (DAAD)
 "Computer Associates" company (USA)
 Goethe-Institute (Munich, Germany)
 University of Hanover (Germany)

Student life

Sport 

At students' disposal there is a Sports Centre, where experienced coaches manage different sections including volleyball, basketball, skiing, judo, table tennis, weightlifting etc.

Amateur art, the Club of smart and cheerful students 

MaSU offers their students an excellent Student Palace with a well-equipped stage and a big auditorium for 700 seats. A ceremony of Student Innogura-tion, award ceremonies, meetings of postgraduates and New Year festivals take place here. Every year students celebrate International student's Day and compete in singing, dancing and playing musical instruments during a traditional "Student spring" festival.

Health, welfare 

Students enjoy a warm and friendly atmosphere and feel calm and confident. There are traditional meetings of the rector and students every semester. Students from other towns are provided with comfortable rooms in student hostels at a lowest price. There is a branch of a student clinic for the teaching staff and students to consult experienced doctors and receive an effective medical treatment (physiotherapy, dental treatment, etc.). There are annual preventive inspections of the collective.
The university provides the patients with free medicine and medical care.

Publishing 

The Publishing Complex of MaSU is more than 20 years old. It was formed to have its own basis for qualified editing of scientific, educational and methodical literature. The Publishing Complex staff aim to provide competent and qualified preparation of teachers' writing for publication, observe State standards and modern requirements to registration of editing literature. The Publishing Complex consists of the publishing department, printing house and some other facilities.

Library 

The library started in 1932 together with MaSU. It houses a universal collection of books and journals specific to different scientific fields and holds over 460,000 books. The Fund of rare books attracts special attention, as one of its most ancient books dates from 1596. University research works are kept here in the Research fund. Library facilities also include the Acquisition department, the Bibliographic department and 3 reading rooms for 400 places for readers. All books and journals may be searched through the electronic catalogue. There may be requested the information about the books the library has been holding since 1995. Since March 2006, there has been functioning an electronic reading room, so that the readers may get the necessary information through the Internet. You may also enjoy the interlibrary service for borrowing books from the 4 largest libraries of Russia (Russian State Library, Russian Peoples' Library, Chelyabinsk and Yekaterinburg region libraries).

References

Educational institutions established in 1932
Buildings and structures in Chelyabinsk Oblast
Universities in Chelyabinsk Oblast
1932 establishments in Russia
Magnitogorsk